Gilmelândia Palmeira dos Santos (born Salvador, Bahia, 20 September 1975) known as Gil or Gilmelândia, is a Brazilian singer, actress and TV presenter. Her unusual first name, which is abbreviated on her CD covers to "Gil", was created by her parents in tribute to a friend of her mother's with an equally unusual name, Jumelânia.

Albums

Live albums

EPs

Compilations

Singles

References

1975 births
Living people
Brazilian actresses
Axé singers
21st-century Brazilian singers
21st-century Brazilian women singers